La Loma de La Joya is a small rural town in the Duarte Province of Dominican Republic. It is located in the northeast portion of the country, in the Cibao region.

Populated places in Duarte Province